West Burton refers to more than one place in England:
West Burton, Nottinghamshire
West Burton, North Yorkshire
West Burton, West Sussex
West Burton power stations